The Daugavpils City Party (DPP) was a regionalist political party located in Daugavpils, Latvia. It was formed in 2000 and was led by Daugavpils Mayor Vitālijs Azarevičs.

In 2005 the party entered the electoral alliance Harmony Centre. Harmony Centre won 26.0% and 29 seats in the 2010 election. The DPP was represented by 1 MP. In 2011 the party merged into the centre-left Harmony party.

Election results

Legislative elections

Daugavpils dome elections

References

External links 
 www.saskanascentrs.lv

Defunct political parties in Latvia
History of Daugavpils
Russian political parties in Latvia